First Partition may refer to:

First Partition of Luxembourg, 1659
First partition of Mecklenburg, 1234
First Partition of Poland, 1772
First partition of the Roman Empire, 285
First Partition Treaty, 1698, between England and France
Primary partition, of a computer hard disk